Lichtenau is a market town  in the district of Ansbach, Middle Franconia, Bavaria, Germany. A small village/town of roughly 3,780 population on the “Castle Road” theme route of Southern Germany. It lies at 390 meters above sea level with an area of 41.39 km² (16 sq mi). A very traditional little town, it is also home to the “Veste Lichtenau” (castle) which now houses the Nuremberg Archives.

References

External links

 Official Site of the town
 Evangelical-Lutheran congregation of Lichtenau

Ansbach (district)